Theodor "Theo" Haag (13 March 1901 – 28 August 1956) was a German field hockey player who competed in the 1928 Summer Olympics.

He was a member and captain of the German field hockey team, which won the bronze medal. He played all four matches as forward and scored five goals.

External links
 
HAAGTHE01 profile

1901 births
1956 deaths
German male field hockey players
Olympic field hockey players of Germany
Field hockey players at the 1928 Summer Olympics
Olympic bronze medalists for Germany
Olympic medalists in field hockey
Medalists at the 1928 Summer Olympics
20th-century German people